Zlatovo is a village situated in Despotovac municipality in Serbia. People in Zlatovo are mainly working on farms and producing corn. 

Populated places in Pomoravlje District